Revelo Electric (REvolutionary VELO; "vélo" is French for "bike") is a Canadian clean mobility company that designs, develops, sells and services Revelo's front pedaling chainless electric bicycles. The company was founded in Toronto in 2012 by CEO Henry Chong, as Revelo Bikes Inc., and the name was changed to Revelo Electric Corp. in 2014. Revelo's core design principles are ease of use and ease of maintenance, and have created their products to fit these principles.

As a Toronto, Canada startup, Revelo has received funding from OCE, VentureStart, and was launched via OCAD University's Imagination Catalyst incubator hub and MaRS Discovery District's entrepreneurship program. The company received backing from crowdfunding via Indiegogo in 2013 for their original LIFEbike concept,. In 2015, their foldable electric bike, the FLEX, was launched.

Models

LIFEbike
The LIFEbike is an electric commuter bike designed from scratch by Henry Chong. The original LIFEbike concept was created by Chong for his Industrial Design thesis at OCAD University in 2011. The next year, it won Chong the MaRS Upstart competition. Deciding to turn what was a project into a marketable idea, Chong launched the LIFEbike on Indiegogo for crowdfunding in the spring of 2013. By July 26, 2013 the campaign had funded $26,656, surpassing its goal of $25,000.

The LIFEbike won the 2012 MaRS Up-Start! competition, which came with a $10,000 prize, enabling Revelo Electric to kick off.

The first prototypes for the LIFEbike were handmade by Chong and tested by 170 riders ranging in age from 16-74. The final bikes were manufactured in Canada and shipped out in March 2014.

LE-1
The LE-1 (Light Electric One) bike is an electric commuter bike launched in May 2014 at the OCE Discovery Conference for limited release. Revamped from the LIFEbike, the bike was renamed to LE-1 for its launch. With its limited production, as of October 2015, the LE-1 is sold out.

Specifications

FLEX
The FLEX is a folding, electric commuting bike released on October 15, 2015 for pre-ordering.

The FLEX was designed to fold to enable easy and practical commuting for its riders. In its folded state, it can be rolled to let commuters use multiple modes of transportation.

During the development of the FLEX, its prototypes and final product samples were tested by over 1000 people. Manufacturing is to be completed overseas, in China. First orders are set to be delivered in April 2016.

Specifications

Awards

References

Canadian companies established in 2012
Manufacturing companies based in Toronto
Electric bicycles